The Peerage of England comprises all peerages created in the Kingdom of England before the Act of Union in 1707. In that year, the Peerages of England and Scotland were replaced by one Peerage of Great Britain. There are five peerages in the United Kingdom in total.

English Peeresses obtained their first seats in the House of Lords under the Peerage Act 1963 from which date until the passage of the House of Lords Act 1999 all Peers of England could sit in the House of Lords.

The ranks of the English peerage are, in descending order, duke, marquess, earl, viscount, and baron. While most newer English peerages descend only in the male line, many of the older ones (particularly older baronies) can descend through females. Such peerages follow the old English inheritance law of moieties so all daughters (or granddaughters through the same root) stand as co-heirs, so some such titles are in such a state of abeyance between these.

Baronets, while holders of hereditary titles, as such are not peers and not entitled to stand for election in the House of Lords. Knights, dames and holders of other non-hereditary orders, decorations, and medals are also not peers.

The following tables only show extant peerages. For lists of every peerage created at a particular rank, including extinct, dormant, and abeyant peerages, see:

 List of dukedoms in the peerages of Britain and Ireland 
 List of marquessates in the peerages of Britain and Ireland
 List of earldoms
 List of viscountcies in the peerages of Britain and Ireland
 List of baronies in the peerages of Britain and Ireland
Each peer is listed only by their highest English title. Peers known by a higher title in one of the other peerages are shown in blue, and peers with more than one title of the same rank in the Peerage of England are shown in orange.

Dukes in the Peerage of England

Marquesses in the Peerage of England

Earls in the Peerage of England

Viscounts in the Peerage of England

Barons and baronesses in the Peerage of England

See also

 British Honours System
 British nobility
 Forms of address in the United Kingdom
 Gentry
 History of the Peerage
 Landed gentry
 Baronetages of England, Nova Scotia, Great Britain, and the United Kingdom
 Peerage, an exposition of great detail
 Peerage of Ireland
 Peerage of Scotland
 Welsh peers and baronets

Notes

References

 
England